Stanley Howard Shaffer (16 August 1944–10 June 2010) was a contemporary American fashion photographer.

He shot for Vogue, Interview, Bloomingdale's, and Victoria's Secret. Celebrity subjects included David Kennedy, Halston, Mariel Hemingway, and Andy Warhol. Other subjects included actresses and models, such as Carla Bruni, Janice Dickinson, Patti Hansen, Jerry Hall,  Uma Thurman, and Rachel Ward and performers such as Louise Robey (whom he married in 2008), Pete Townshend, and John Phillips with Geneviève Waïte. As a filmmaker, his short films won awards internationally.

Shaffer was born in Brooklyn, New York, in 1944. He also grew up in rural Illinois.

References

External links 
 http://www.stanshaffer.com - Official website (under reconstruction)
 "You Should Have Been With Me" - Official website
 Amazon Listing of His Retrospective
 Instagram: You Should Have Been With Me "Continued exploration by family and friends of the archives of Stan Shaffer."

1944 births
2010 deaths
Fashion photographers
Commercial photographers
Photographers from New York City
American portrait photographers
School of Visual Arts faculty